RPMI 1640, also known as RPMI medium, is a growth medium used in cell culture. RPMI 1640 was developed by George E. Moore, Robert E. Gerner, and H. Addison Franklin in 1966 at Roswell Park Comprehensive Cancer Center (formerly known as Roswell Park Memorial Institute), from where it derives its name. A modification of McCoy′s 5A medium (or RPMI 1630), it was originally formulated to support lymphoblastoid cells in suspension cultures, but can also support a wide variety of adherent cells. 

It has traditionally been used for growth of human lymphocytes. This medium contains a great deal of phosphate and is formulated for use in a 5% carbon dioxide atmosphere. RPMI 1640 has traditionally been used for the serum-free expansion of human lymphoid cells. RPMI 1640 uses a bicarbonate buffering system and differs from most mammalian cell culture media in its typical pH 8 formulation. Properly supplemented with serum or an adequate serum replacement, RPMI 1640 allows the cultivation of many cell types, especially human T/B-lymphocytes, bone marrow cells, and hybridoma cells.

Composition
One liter of RPMI 1640 contains:
Glucose (2 g)
pH indicator (phenol red, 5 mg)
Salts (6 g sodium chloride, 2 g sodium bicarbonate, 1.512 g disodium phosphate, 400 mg potassium chloride, 100 mg magnesium sulfate, and 100 mg calcium nitrate)
Amino acids (300 mg glutamine; 200 mg arginine; 50 mg each asparagine, cystine, leucine, and isoleucine; 40 mg lysine hydrochloride; 30 mg serine; 20 mg each aspartic acid, glutamic acid, hydroxyproline, proline, threonine, tyrosine, and valine; 15 mg each histidine, methionine, and phenylalanine; 10 mg glycine; 5 mg tryptophan; and 1 mg reduced glutathione)
Vitamins (35 mg i-inositol; 3 mg choline chloride; 1 mg each para-aminobenzoic acid, folic acid, nicotinamide, pyridoxine hydrochloride, and thiamine hydrochloride; 0.25 mg calcium pantothenate; 0.2 mg each biotin and riboflavin; and 0.005 mg cyanocobalamin)

References

External links
 http://www.bioind.com/RPMI1640
 http://www.sigmaaldrich.com/Area_of_Interest/Life_Science/Cell_Culture/Product_Lines/Classic_Media___Salts/RPMI_Media.html
 http://www.invitrogen.com/site/us/en/home/Products-and-Services/Applications/Cell-Culture/Mammalian-Cell-Culture/Classical_Media/RPMI.html
 http://www.captivatebio.com/rpmi-1640-medium.html

Cell culture media